The men's snowboard cross competition of the Sochi 2014 Olympics was held at Rosa Khutor Extreme Park on 18 February 2014. The seeding run was cancelled due to fog and latest World Cup standings were used to seed the competitors. The finals were re-scheduled to 08:30 on 18 February.

Schedule
All times are (UTC+4).

Results
The event was held on 18 February.

Elimination round

1/8 round
Due to the cancellation of the seeding rounds, World Cup standings were used to populate the elimination round heats. The top three finishers from each heat advance to the quarterfinals.

Heat 1

Heat 2

Heat 3

Heat 4

Heat 5

Heat 6

Heat 7

Heat 8

Quarterfinals
From here, the athletes participated in six-person elimination races, with the top three from each race advancing.

Quarterfinal 1

Quarterfinal  2

Quarterfinal 3

Quarterfinal 4

Semifinals

Semifinal  1

Semifinal 2

Finals
Small Final

Large Final

References

Men's snowboarding at the 2014 Winter Olympics